Roberto Mouzo (born 8 January 1953 in Avellaneda) is a retired Argentine football defender. Raised from the Boca Juniors youth academy, and having played the vast majority of his career for Boca Juniors, Mouzo is considered one of the great idols of the club. He is the all-time most appearing player for the team, with 426 matches played. Mouzo also won 6 titles with the club, with 26 goals scored.

Mouzo also has the most appearances in Superclásico with 29 matches played (shared with club's legend Silvio Marzolini). He was also capped for the Argentina national team, having played in 1983 Copa América.

Career

Player
Mouzo started his career in a 0–0 draw with Gimnasia y Esgrima (M) on 11 November 1971. Mouzo went on to make a record 426 appearances for Boca in all competitions, 396 in the Argentine league, making him the player with the most games in the history of Boca Juniors. Mouzo won all of the titles with Boca including the Copa Libertadores of 1977 and 1978.

Mouzo scored 24 goals during his career at Boca, 21 in the league and 3 in the 1977 Copa Libertadores.

In 1984 Mouzo left Boca Juniors due to a conflictive relation with club executives. He made his last appearance for Boca on 16 December in a 2–0 win over Rosario Central. After leaving Boca, Mouzo had short spells with Estudiantes de Río Cuarto, and Club 9 de Octubre in Ecuador before returning to Argentina to finish his career in Atlanta that was competing in Primera B.

Mouzo was part of the team that won the first World Cup of Masters in 1987. His good performance during the tournament called the attention of Brazilian club Vitória which signed Mouzo for 6 months. Nevertheless, he was injured during the pre-season and had to return to Argentina. After he recovered from the injure, Mouzo played in Regional leagues for two years, in Urdinarrain of Gualeguaychú and Deportivo Villa Gesell.

After retirement 
When Mouzo retired from football, he worked as an insurance seller and managed some football academies. Mouzo returned to football as youth coach at Boca Juniors before becoming interim coach (sharing duties with Francisco Sá) in 1996 after the sacking of Carlos Bilardo. Nevertheless, in 2003 he was fired by the Mauricio Macri administration after eight years of work at the club.

In January 2009 with Jorge Amor Ameal as president of Boca Juniors, Mouzo returned to the club after manager Carlos Bianchi offered him to coach the 4th division. After several years of service, Mouzo retired in 2018.

In March 2020, Mouzo admitted that he attempted to commit suicide in 2009, soon after his wife died, which brought him a big depression.

Honours
Boca Juniors
 Primera División (3): 1976 Metropolitano, 1976 Nacional, 1981 Metropolitano
 Copa Libertadores (2): 1977, 1978
 Intercontinental Cup (1): 1977

In his own words

References

External links

Historia de Boca player profile 
Mouzo's Biography 

1953 births
Living people
Sportspeople from Avellaneda
Argentine footballers
Argentina international footballers
1983 Copa América players
Association football defenders
Argentine Primera División players
Boca Juniors footballers
Copa Libertadores-winning players
Argentine football managers
Boca Juniors managers
Estudiantes de Río Cuarto footballers